Cahul is a district in the south of Moldova, with the administrative center at Cahul. As of January 2014 estimates, Cahul District had a population of 124,700.

History
The district has been inhabited since the Stone Age (50-45,000 BC). Two ancient settlements were founded around 1300 BC; archaeologists have found items belonging to the Bronze Age (15th-13th centuries BC). According to estimates of specialists, another village was established here around 300-400 BC. That has been confirmed by the remains of houses burned and the fragments of clay pots. Archaeological monuments recorded a settlement arising from employment of Dacia in the Roman Empire and devastated by the Huns in 376. The presence of nomads in these places is attested by the four burial mounds.

Localities with the earliest documented attestation are Crihana Veche, Manta, Valeni, Slobozia Mare, and Larga Veche; they were documented for the first time in 1425–1447. In the 16th and 17th centuries, the economy developed in agriculture, winery, and trade, along with an increase in population. On August 1, 1770, near Cahul lake, the Battle of Cahul took place (Russo-Turkish War, 1768-1774). It was the most important land battle of the Russo-Turkish War and one of the largest battles of the 18th century. In 1812, after the Russo-Turkish War, there was an intense russification of the native population during the occupation of Basarabia by the Russian Empire during this period (1812–1856, 1878–1917). Between 1813 and 1850, the Tsarist government colonized some of the region with Russians, Ukrainians, Bulgarians, and Gagauz. These ethnic groups now constitute 21% of the population of the district.

In 1856–1878, the district became part of Romania after the Crimean War. After the collapse of the Russian Empire, Bessarabia united with Romania (1918–1940, 1941–1944); the district was the center of Cahul County. In 1940, after the Molotov-Ribbentrop Treaty, Basarabia was occupied by the USSR. In 1991, as a result of the proclamation of Independence of Moldova, Cahul County was integrated into this country (1991–2003). In 2003, Cahul became an administrative unit of Moldova.

Geography

Cahul district is located in the southern part of the Republic of Moldova. The district is located in the extreme southern point of Moldova in Giurgiulești village. Cantemir District is in the north, Gagauzia in the northeast, Taraclia District in the east, the border of Ukraine in the south and Romania in the west. There is a mild amount of Erosion.

Climate
The climate is temperate continental. The region is considered the most arid and hottest in Moldova. Temperatures are  higher than the other regions. The amount of precipitation during the year is uneven and there are often periods of drought.

Fauna
Animal life includes typical European steppe fauna, with the presence of mammals, such as foxes, hedgehogs, deer, wild boar, polecat, wild cat, ermine and others. Birds include partridges, crows, eagles, starling and swallow.

Flora
Forests occupy 11.5% of the district. They are made up of tree species such as acacia, oak, ash, hornbeam, linden, maple and walnut. Other plant life includes wormwood, knotweed, fescue and nettle.

Rivers
The hydrographic network is based on the Prut River and the Danube River, which forms meadows, ponds, natural lakes. The two biggest natural lakes in Moldova are in this region, Manta (21 km2) and Beleu (11 km2). An area of 1,200 meters is accessible from the Danube to the Black Sea, and basins of Central and Eastern Europe.

Administrative subdivisions
Localities: 56
Administrative center: Cahul
Cities: Cahul
Villages: 18
Communes: 37

Demographics

As of 1 January 2012, the district population was 124,900, of which 31.9% was urban and 68.1% was rural.

Births (2010): 1524 (12.2 per 1000)
Deaths (2010): 1466 (11.7 per 1000)
Growth rate (2010): 58 (0.5 per 1000)

Ethnic groups 

Footnote: * There is an ongoing controversy regarding the ethnic identification of Moldovans and Romanians.

Religion 
Christians - 94.3%
Orthodox Christians - 89.3%
Protestant - 5.0%
Baptists - 3.5%
Seventh-day Adventists - 1.2%
Pentecostals - 0.2%
Evangelicals - 0.1%
Other - 2.8%
No Religion - 2.4%
Atheists - 0.5%

Economy
In terms of economic development, Cahul district is characterized by the development of industries based primarily on various raw materials. There are 11 private wineries and 8 bakeries. In the cheese industry, there is a factory, collecting cereal and processing vegetables and fruit. Light industry is present in two garment factories (SA Tricon and Laboratorio Tessala Mol SRL). Building materials are present in plant and plant ceramsite concrete. Agriculture is the main branch of the district. Of the total 154,600 ha, 64% is agricultural land. The largest share of arable land is: 81%, perennial plantations.  18% incumbent, and 1% vegetable plantations.

Education
The total number of educational institutions is 129. The total number of students in schools is 23,059, in colleges is 1,450, in vocational schools is 776, in universities is 2,547, and in sports schools is 585.

Culture
There are four museums, 85 bands, 25 with the title of model, 47 houses of culture, and 48 libraries.

Politics
Cahul district has mainly right-wing parties. In Moldova, Cahul is represented by the AEI. The PCRM has had a continuous fall in percentage the last three elections

During the last three elections AEI had an increase of 43.2%

Elections

|-
!style="background-color:#E9E9E9" align=center colspan="2" valign=center|Parties and coalitions
!style="background-color:#E9E9E9" align=right|Votes
!style="background-color:#E9E9E9" align=right|%
!style="background-color:#E9E9E9" align=right|+/−
|-
| 
|align=left|Party of Communists of the Republic of Moldova
|align="right"|20,568
|align="right"|37.77
|align="right"|−0.59
|-
| 
|align=left|Liberal Democratic Party of Moldova
|align="right"|18,002
|align="right"|33.06
|align="right"|+9.54
|-
| 
|align=left|Democratic Party of Moldova
|align="right"|6,347
|align="right"|11,66
|align="right"|+1.00
|-
| 
|align=left|Liberal Party
|align="right"|4,911
|align="right"|9.02
|align="right"|−6.69
|-
|bgcolor=#0033cc|
|align=left|European Action Movement
|align="right"|1,223
|align="right"|2.25
|align="right"|+2.25
|-
| 
|align=left|Party Alliance Our Moldova
|align="right"|578
|align="right"|1.06
|align="right"|-6.63
|-
|bgcolor="grey"|
|align=left|Other Party
|align="right"|2,840
|align="right"|5.18
|align="right"|+1.30
|-
|align=left style="background-color:#E9E9E9" colspan="2"|Total (turnout 57.84%)
|width="30" align="right" style="background-color:#E9E9E9"|54,824
|width="30" align="right" style="background-color:#E9E9E9"|100.00
|width="30" align="right" style="background-color:#E9E9E9"|

Health
Cahul district has a hospital with 500 beds, a center of family doctors, 28 family doctors' offices, 9 health centers and 12 medical points.

Tourism

 The "Nufărul Alb" ("White Nymphaea") Balneotherapy and Well-being Centre, located in Cahul, is well known for its thermal spas.
 Old Rite Eastern Orthodox Church in Cahul city
 Cathedral of St. Michael and Gabriel in Cahul
 Monument to heroes of the Battle of Larga 1770, Badicul Moldovenesc

See also 
 Cahul County
 Talk: Cahul district (Romanian)

References

 District population per year
 Descrierea generală a raionului Cahul
 Rezultatele alegerilor din 28 noiembrie 2010 în raionul Cahul

External links
 District site

 
Districts of Moldova